The Roman Catholic Diocese of Tanjung Selor is a diocese located in the city of Tanjung Selor in the Ecclesiastical province of Samarinda in Indonesia.

History
 January 9, 2002: Established as the Diocese of Tanjung Selor from the Diocese of Samarinda

Leadership
 Bishops of Tanjung Selor (Roman rite)
 Bishop Justinus Tarmana Harjosusanto, M.S.F. (January 9, 2002 – February 16, 2015)
 Bishop Paulinus Yan Olla, M.S.F. (May 5, 2018–present)

References
 GCatholic.org
 Catholic Hierarchy

Roman Catholic dioceses in Indonesia
Christian organizations established in 2002
Roman Catholic dioceses and prelatures established in the 21st century
2002 establishments in Indonesia